Michael Quinn Brewer (born October 24, 1959) is a former Major League Baseball right fielder who played for one season. He played in 12 games for the Kansas City Royals during the 1986 Kansas City Royals season.

External links

1959 births
Living people
Major League Baseball right fielders
Baseball players from Shreveport, Louisiana
Caimanes del Sur players
American expatriate baseball players in the Dominican Republic
Kansas City Royals players
African-American baseball players
Fort Myers Royals players
Jacksonville Suns players
Maine Guides players
Memphis Chicks players
Omaha Royals players
Junior college baseball players in the United States
Junior college men's basketball players in the United States
Palo Alto High School alumni